"Showdown" is a 1973 song written by Jeff Lynne and recorded by the Electric Light Orchestra (ELO). It was the band's last contemporary recording to be released on the Harvest label. It was released as a single and reached No 12 in the UK Singles Chart, in the week beginning 28 October, and No 9 on the Norwegian chart VG-lista.

Release
In the US the song was included on the album On the Third Day (1973), while in the UK the song was omitted from that album but featured a year later on the band's first compilation album, also entitled Showdown. In 2006 the remastered issue of On the Third Day would feature the song on the album in both countries for the first time.

The song showed a change of style for ELO, with a funkier backbeat beneath the band's trademark sweeping strings, and the inclusion of a clavinet. The record was a favourite of John Lennon's at the time, who dubbed the band "Son of Beatles" in a US radio interview.

Marc Bolan of T. Rex was at the session where the song was recorded and played on several of the band's tracks at that time, but did not play on "Showdown" itself. Instead, Jeff Lynne borrowed Bolan's Gibson Firebird guitar  to play over the instrumental break.

Cash Box said the song "can almost be termed 'classical blues' and sheds a new light on the group that most folks will immediately be attracted to."

B-side

The B-side, "In Old England Town", is an edited instrumental version of "In Old England Town (Boogie No. 2)" by Lynne. Recorded in 1972, this was the opening track of the band's second LP ELO 2, and was one of two songs on the album that featured Roy Wood on cello and bass guitar, the other being "From the Sun to the World". Shortly after recording these tracks, Wood abandoned ELO to form Wizzard, and he was not originally credited on the LP sleeve. Normally Wood and Lynne co-produced all their collaborations, but it is unknown whether Wood was involved in the production of either track.

A planned concept album entitled "The Lost Planet" was quietly abandoned and sessions for the second LP proper began May 1972. Two new Jeff Lynne songs, "From the Sun to the World" and "In Old England Town" were the first to be recorded and included Roy Wood on bass guitar and cello, but in little more than a month, the co-founder of the ELO concept left the group. —Rob Caiger, 28 March 2006, ELO II Remaster

The song was included in ELO's first 1972 tour playlist, simply titled Jeff's Boogie #2, and had a different set of lyrics. This early live version was filmed for Granada Television's Set of Six in 1972; that is the only live footage of the original ELO known to exist. These songs were released on a 2006 DVD called ELO – Total Rock Review.

The Moog intro of the edited version was later sampled and included on Paul Weller's hit single "The Changingman", as was the main riff from "10538 Overture".

Personnel
Source:
Jeff Lynne – vocals, guitars
Bev Bevan – drums, percussion
Richard Tandy – piano, Moog, clavinet, Wurlitzer electric piano
Mike de Albuquerque – bass, backing vocals
Mike Edwards – cello
Wilf Gibson – violin
Colin Walker – cello

Charts

Jeff Lynne version
Lynne re-recorded the song in his own home studio in 2012. It was released on the compilation album Mr. Blue Sky: The Very Best of Electric Light Orchestra along with other re-recorded ELO songs, under the ELO name.

References

External links
In-depth Song Analysis at the Jeff Lynne Song Database (jefflynnesongs.com)

1973 singles
1973 songs
Electric Light Orchestra songs
Song recordings produced by Jeff Lynne
Songs written by Jeff Lynne
Harvest Records singles
United Artists Records singles